Michael A. Häusser FRS FMedSci is professor of Neuroscience, based in the Wolfson Institute for Biomedical Research at University College London (UCL).

Education
Hausser was educated at the University of Oxford where he was awarded a DPhil in 1992 for research supervised by James Julian Bennett Jack on neurons in the substantia nigra.

Research
Häusser's research interests are in neuroscience, dendrites, biological neural networks and artificial neural networks.

Awards and honours
Häusser was elected a Fellow of the Royal Society (FRS) in 2015. His certificate of election reads: 

Häusser was also elected a Fellow of the Academy of Medical Sciences (FMedSci) in 2012.

References

Living people
Fellows of the Royal Society
Fellows of the Academy of Medical Sciences (United Kingdom)
Year of birth missing (living people)